The Philippine House Committee on Social Services, or House Social Services Committee is a standing committee of the Philippine House of Representatives.

Jurisdiction 
As prescribed by House Rules, the committee's jurisdiction is on the social development and social services and interventions that will enhance and develop the life of the community and individual.

Members, 18th Congress

Historical members

18th Congress

Chairperson 
 Sandra Eriguel (La Union–2nd, NUP) August 7, 2019 – December 7, 2020

Vice Chairperson 
 Marissa Andaya (Camarines Sur–1st, NPC)

See also 
 House of Representatives of the Philippines
 List of Philippine House of Representatives committees
 Department of Social Welfare and Development

Notes

References

External links 
House of Representatives of the Philippines

Social